Alfred Louis Fernand Ghislain Claeys-Boúúaert (16 May 1844 – 4 March 1936) was a Belgian lawyer and politician. He was a senator from 1894 to 1921.

Early years
Alfred Louis Fernand Ghislain Claeys was born in Ghent, Belgium, on 16 May 1844.
His parents were Ferdinandus Desidèrius-Léo Claeys and Mathilde-MariaJoanna-Gislena Boûûaert.
He studied Classics at Sainte-Barbe College in Ghent and Notre-Dame de la Paix College in Namur, then studied Law at Ghent University.
He graduated with a doctorate in Law in 1866.
Alfred married Céline De Bruyn (1846–1928) and they had five children.

Lawyer

Claeys-Boúúaert had a distinguished career as a lawyer, became a member of the legal council in 1882 and secretary of the council in 1882
He became president in 1892.
In 1896 he was elected vice-president of the National Federation of Lawyers.
Due to the pending extinction of the Boùùaert family (also written Boúúaert), Alfred and his brother Gustave (1842–1921) changed their surnames to Claeys-Boúúaert in 1888.

Senator

In Ghent Claeys-Boúúaert played an active role within the Catholic party.
In 1894 he was named a senator by the provincial council of East Flanders, where he held office until 1921.
He helped draft the law on rehabilitation in penal matters of 25 April 1896, and the law protecting the pensions of provincial and municipal civil servants from seizure of 20 June 1896.

Claeys-Boúúaert was involved in debates related to the colonial enterprises of King Leopold II.
On 28 June 1895 he refrained from voting on a law to grant loans to the Congo Free State and the Compagnie du chemin de fer du Congo on the grounds that Belgium was not yet well informed about what was happening in the Congo.
In 1906 he was part of the Commission des XVII and signed a favorable report by this commission on the colonial charter.
He was a director of the Compagnie du Lubilash, which carried out mainly agricultural activities in Kamina Territory.

He completed construction in 1890–1892.

Death and legacy

Claeys-Boúúaert died in Ghent on 4 March 1936.
He was an officer of the Order of Leopold II and commander of the Order of Saint Alexander (Bulgaria).
The church in Mariakerke has a monument to Alfred Claeys Bouuaert on its outside wall, and excellent neo-gothic funerary monument.
His grandson Alfred-Marie Claeys-Boùùaert (1906-1993) later became governor of the Mandate Territories Ruanda-Urundi.
The  , with more than 100 rooms, remained in the family until it was sold to the Mariakerke municipality in 1971.

Notes

Sources

External links

 
 

1844 births
1936 deaths
20th-century Belgian lawyers
Politicians from Ghent
Members of the Senate (Belgium)
Belgian Roman Catholics
Ghent University alumni
Jurists from Ghent
19th-century Belgian lawyers